NAC Stadion Heuvelstraat is a football stadium in Breda, Netherlands. It is used for football matches, hosted the home matches of NAC Breda and is now homeground of RKSV Groen Wit. The stadium was able to hold 5,500 people  and opened in 1931.

References

Defunct football venues in the Netherlands
NAC Breda
Sports venues in Breda
Sports venues completed in 1931